William Herbert Wilkinson (12 March 1881 – 4 June 1961) was an English first-class cricketer, who was also a footballer in the Football League First Division.

Cricket career
Born in Thorpe Hesley, Yorkshire, England, Wilkinson was a first-class cricketer who played 127 matches between 1903 and 1910.  He played for Yorkshire County Cricket Club from 1903 to 1910,  and one match for the North of England in 1908.  He also played for the Yorkshire Second XI from 1902 to 1912, and for R. W. Frank's XI in 1906.

A left-handed batsman, Wilkinson scored 3,912 runs at 21.73 with one century, a knock of 103 against Sussex. He took 31 wickets, bowling slow left arm orthodox spin, at 31.32, with a best of 4 for 23 against Oxford University. He also took 4 for 27 against Sussex.

Football career
Wilkinson played between 1901 and 1908 as an inside forward for Sheffield United. His brother, Bernard, also played for United and served as team captain.

Death
Wilkinson died in Winson Green, Warwickshire, England, in June 1961, aged 80.

References

1881 births
1961 deaths
Cricketers from Rotherham
Footballers from Rotherham
Sheffield United F.C. players
Bolton Wanderers F.C. players
English footballers
English cricketers
Yorkshire cricketers
Association football forwards
North v South cricketers
English cricketers of 1890 to 1918